Port of Call (also known as Harbour City) is a 1948 Swedish drama film written and directed by Ingmar Bergman. This film is strongly influenced by neorealism.

Plot
The film opens when we see Berit, a young woman living in a working-class port town, tries to drown herself by jumping into the sea. Among the witnesses of this incident is Gösta, a sailor newly returned from overseas and intent upon staying on land. By chance they begin a relationship. We then realized that Berit's checkered past and the existence of her abusive and cruel mother. The plot and character development centre on the relationship between Berit and Gösta, as she discloses her troubled past of family problems and various affairs to him and he must deal with his own feelings and conflicts about such disclosure. The film ends at a high note with Berit and Gösta decide to stay together and fight for their future.

Cast
 Nine-Christine Jönsson as Berit Irene Holm
 Bengt Eklund as Gösta
 Mimi Nelson as Gertrud
 Berta Hall as Berit's mother
 Birgitta Valberg as Mrs. Vilander
 Sif Ruud as Mrs. Krona
 Britta Billsten as Prostitute
 Harry Ahlin as Skåningen
 Nils Hallberg as Gustav
 Sven-Eric Gamble as Eken
 Yngve Nordwall as The Supervisor
 Nils Dahlgren as Gertrud's father
 Hans Strååt as Mr. Vilander
 Erik Hell as Berit's father

References

External links

1948 films
1948 drama films
Swedish drama films
1940s Swedish-language films
Swedish black-and-white films
Films directed by Ingmar Bergman
Films with screenplays by Ingmar Bergman
1940s Swedish films